In fluid dynamics, Lamb surfaces are smooth, connected orientable two-dimensional surfaces, which are simultaneously stream-surfaces and vortex surfaces, named after the physicist Horace Lamb. The necessary and sufficient condition are

Flows with Lamb surfaces are neither irrotational nor Beltrami. But the generalized Beltrami flows has Lamb surfaces.

See also
Beltrami flow

References

Fluid dynamics